Gabin Allambatnan (born 19 February 2000) is a Chadian professional footballer who plays as a goalkeeper for Elite One club Coton Sport and the Chad national team.

References

External links
 
 

2000 births
Living people
Chadian footballers
Chad international footballers
Association football goalkeepers
Foullah Edifice FC players
Coton Sport FC de Garoua players
Chadian expatriate footballers
Expatriate footballers in Cameroon
Chadian expatriate sportspeople in Cameroon
People from Hadjer-Lamis Region